Dunn Commercial Historic District is a national historic district located at Dunn, Harnett County, North Carolina. It encompasses 54 contributing buildings and one contributing structure in the central business district of Dunn.  The predominantly commercial buildings were built between about 1900 and 1959, and includes notable examples of Italianate style architecture.  Notable buildings include the Fitchett Drug Store (c. 1912), Cottondale Hotel (1924), Fleishman Brothers Company building (c. 1925), Prince's Department Store Building (c. 1930), Christo-Cola Bottling Works Building (c. 1913), White Way Theater Building (c. 1904), Johnson Cotton Company Building (c. 1925), and (former) Dunn Post Office (1937).

It was listed on the National Register of Historic Places in 2009.

References

Commercial buildings on the National Register of Historic Places in North Carolina
Historic districts on the National Register of Historic Places in North Carolina
Italianate architecture in North Carolina
Buildings and structures in Harnett County, North Carolina
National Register of Historic Places in Harnett County, North Carolina